The M40 corridor is the area adjacent to the M40 motorway running through England. It is one of the main routes between London and Birmingham, the other being that followed by the M1 motorway.

This includes the Chiltern Main Line, which also runs in the same area between the two cities. The route taken by the railway line closely follows the motorway except for the central section where the railway does not serve Oxford. Unlike the motorway, the Chiltern Main Line stretches deep into both London and Birmingham.

Route
The area followed by the M40 includes southern Buckinghamshire, eastern Oxfordshire and central/southern Warwickshire. Despite serving London and Birmingham, the M40 does not enter either cites, instead other roads/motorways continue onwards (e.g. the A40 continues right into central London).

South
The southern end is completely within Buckinghamshire with the town served being High Wycombe. Both road and rail travel in a north west-south east direction.

Central
The central section covers Oxfordshire and Bucks. The main population centre served is Oxford.

North
Both rail and road now travel sharply to the north west, serving Warwickshire.

Main towns/cities served
The following table only includes places situated near the motorway and those close enough to be considered 'near the motorway' (like Aylesbury). Other places that may use the motorway (for access to the north) are not included as they have other motorway access (for example Slough). Small villages are not included. Population figures are based on the 2001 census by the Office for National Statistics

Economy

Buckinghamshire
George Wimpey, RAF Air Command, Hyundai UK, Dreams, the UK base of Ariston (now owned by Indesit) and the UK headquarters of Staples are based in High Wycombe. The UK base of Robert Bosch is in Denham, near Gerrards Cross. Pioneer UK is in Stoke Poges and the Barracuda Group (owner of Varsity) is in Marlow, both locations being near the motorway.

Oxfordshire
Kraft Foods Banbury, Westminster group plc, Prodrive and Ascari Cars all have offices or are based in Banbury. The head office of Travelodge UK is located in Thame.

Warwickshire
Stratford-upon-Avon is world-famous as Shakespeare's hometown and so tourism is a major industry. The NFU Mutual Insurance Company is also based in the town. ConocoPhillips, JET (petrol), BMW, and Volvo Group are based in Warwick.

References

External links
Places of interest along the M40 corridor

Motorways in England
Transport in Buckinghamshire
Transport in Oxfordshire
Transport in Warwickshire
Rail transport in England
Road transport in England
Roads in England